Yeongam Jong clan was one of the Korean clans. Their Bon-gwan was in Yeongam County, South Jeolla Province. Jong clan was begun because Duke Huan of Song appointed his second son as Jongseong’s lord, but it is not clear that how Duke Huan of Song’s second son entered Korea. Jong Gwan su, a family member of Duke Huan of Song’s second son, was appointed as Prince of Yeongam during Taejo of Joseon’s reign in Joseon. , Jong Gwan su’s descendant, began Yeongam Jong clan because he was bestowed territories in Yeongam.

See also 
 Korean clan names of foreign origin

References

External links 
 

Korean clan names of Chinese origin